Lagarosiphon major is a monocotic aquatic plant native to Southern Africa. Common names include African elodea, curly waterweed, oxygen weed and South African oxygen weed. It is used as freshwater aquarium plant.

It is an invasive plant in some countries. In New Zealand it is listed on the National Pest Plant Accord and is classed as a noxious weed in the United States. Lagarosiphon Major was added to the European Union's 
List of Invasive Alien Species of Union concern on 3 August 2016. This means - amongst other things- that it is illegal to sell this plant in the whole of the European Union or to dump it in the environment.

Distribution
Ireland: Co.Galway in parts of upper Lough Corrib.

References

External links
 Global Invasive Species Database
 Species Profile - Oxygen Weed (Lagarosiphon major). National Invasive Species Information Center, United States National Agricultural Library

Hydrocharitaceae
Flora of Southern Africa
Freshwater plants